Brian J. Aungst, Sr. served as the mayor of one of Florida's largest cities, Clearwater, for two terms from 1999-2005. Term limits kept him from seeking a third term. He was credited with turning a stagnant city around, serving as the catalyst to attract unprecedented economic development to a once dormant community.

During his six-year tenure he attracted nearly $750 million of economic development to Clearwater including a sweeping redevelopment of the city's number-one economic engine, Clearwater Beach.

Mayor Aungst served on Pinellas County's Tourist Development Council, the advisory board of Pinellas County's Convention and Visitors Bureau, using his position as mayor to encourage tourists to visit the area, especially after the events of 9/11/2001. 

Aungst was instrumental in putting together a public-private partnership to build a new Community Sports Complex Bright House Networks Field to host Philadelphia Phillies Spring Training Baseball and their minor league team the Clearwater Threshers and other community events. In addition he spearheaded a public-private partnership to build a new  signature public library in downtown Clearwater. Under his leadership the city built multiple community recreation centers and athletic complexes and was named Sports Illustrated magazine's "Sports Town USA" for the state of Florida. He was the first Mayor of Clearwater, Florida to be re-elected unopposed since 1956.  Aungst supported his successor Mayor Frank Hibbard who was elected unopposed to replace him in 2005 and re-elected in 2008.

Brian Aungst presided over the Clearwater City Commission for almost six years of unprecedented growth.

References

Mayors of Clearwater, Florida
Living people
1954 births